Roadblock is a 1951 American film noir starring Charles McGraw and Joan Dixon. The 73-minute crime thriller was shot on location in Los Angeles. The film was directed by Harold Daniels and the cinematography is by Nicholas Musuraca.

Plot
Insurance investigator Joe Peters (McGraw) and his partner Harry Miller (Louis Jean Heydt) solve a lucrative recovery case and prepare to fly home. Joe meets and gets played by Diane (Dixon) at the airport. Lacking enough money to fly on her own she pretends to be his wife without his knowledge in order to get half fare on her ticket. They wind up assigned to the same hotel room after a storm forces an unscheduled stop.  An uneasy detente develops.

Joe is attracted to the comely but diffident Diane, despite his dislike for "chiselers". She makes it quite clear she loves the finer things in life, which "Honest Joe" (as Diane calls him) cannot possibly afford on his small salary of $350 per month. They part uneasily when they reach Los Angeles.

When Joe and Harry are assigned to check out the prime suspect in a string of fur robberies, Kendall Webb (Lowell Gilmore). Joe runs into Diane, who has become Webb's mistress. Their mutual attraction flares up and Joe, in order to finance a dream life with Diane, decides to use inside information on a cash shipment of $1.25 million to set up a robbery for Webb in return for one-third of the take.

Unaware of the deal and disillusioned at being a kept woman, Diane decides that her love for Joe is greater than her avarice. When she tells Joe she wants to get married he tries to back out with Webb. However, Webb convinces him that Diane might not feel the same after a few months living on his paltry pay.

The railway mail car robbery is successful, but a railroad employee is injured and later dies. The robbery coincides with Joe and Diane's honeymoon, giving him an alibi. One of the robbers is identified and arrested. With the investigation encroaching, Joe confesses to Diane what he has done.

Desperate, Joe arranges to meet Webb on a desolate stretch of highway by telling him he has a plan to get them out of their mess. Instead, he knocks Webb out and stages a car accident in which Webb is killed and his share of the money partially burned.

Harry figures out that his partner is involved and pleads with him to turn himself into the police. Cornered, Joe tries to flee to Mexico with Diane, but is tracked down and shot. He dies in Diane's arms.

Cast
 Charles McGraw as Joe Peters 
 Joan Dixon as Diane 
 Lowell Gilmore as Kendall Webb 
 Louis Jean Heydt as Harry Miller 
 Milburn Stone as Egan

Reception

Critical response
Hans J. Wollstein, writing for Allmovie, calls the film a "low-budget but highly engrossing film noir".

Dennis Schwartz, at Ozus' World Movie Reviews writes "In the end everything was done in such a flat manner, that it was hard to care that straight-shooter McGraw lost his integrity and life for an icy broad who ironically would have loved him the way he was."

According to film critics Bob Porfiero and Alain Silver, the screenwriters took a hard-boiled mystery plot and combined it with "an aura of middle-class malaise and pervasive corruption to provide a motivation for Peters' alienation and fall."  The noir notion of entrapment is illustrated by the staging of Peters' death in the semi-dry Los Angeles river bed, and it is one of the early scenes of a car chase filmed there.

References

External links
 
 
 
 
 

1951 films
1951 crime drama films
1950s heist films
American black-and-white films
American crime drama films
American heist films
Film noir
Films scored by Paul Sawtell
1950s English-language films
Films directed by Harold Daniels
1950s American films